Kuljinder Singh Sidhu is an Indian actor, writer and film producer, who has appeared in Punjabi films.
Kuljinder made his debut as an actor and writer with the movie Sadda Haq, which he also produced. Apart from this, he has produced and written the story and screenplay of the 2014 Punjabi film Yoddha: The Warrior, in which he played lead role antagonist Rahul Dev. He has received Ptc Best Actor Award by Critics and Ptc Best Screenplay Writer Award by Critics, for the film Sadda Haq.

Filmography

As an actor 
Sadda Haq (2013)
Yoddha: The Warrior (2014)
 Shareek (2015)
 Jung e Azadi
 Punjab Singh (2018)
 Asees (2018)
 Dakuaan Da Munda (2018)
 Ardaas Karaan (2019)
 Mitti: Virasat Babbaran Di'' (2019)

As a writer and producer
 Mini Punjab (2009)
Sadda Haq (2013)
Yoddha: The Warrior(2014)

References

External links

Indian male film actors
Indian film producers
Indian writers
Indian screenwriters
Living people
People from Jalandhar
21st-century Indian male actors
Year of birth missing (living people)